The women's 800 metres at the 2012 IAAF World Indoor Championships will be held at the Ataköy Athletics Arena on 9 and 11 March.

Medalists

Records

Qualification standards

Schedule

Results

Heats

Qualification: 1st of each heat (Q) plus 3 fastest times (q) qualified.

Final
The final started at 15:35.

References

800 metres
800 metres at the World Athletics Indoor Championships
2012 in women's athletics